Orleans (officially and in French Orléans) is a suburb of Ottawa, Ontario, Canada. The Canada 2021 Census determined that Orléans' population was 125,937. Prior to being amalgamated into Ottawa in 2001, the community of Orléans was spread over two municipal jurisdictions, the eastern portion being in the pre-amalgamation City of Cumberland, the western portion in the City of Gloucester. According to the 2021 census, 75,453 people lived in the Cumberland portion of Orleans, while 50,484 people lived in the Gloucester portion. Today, Orléans spans the municipal wards of Orléans East-Cumberland, Orléans West-Innes, and Orléans South-Navan. Orléans contains a significant francophone population.

History 

It was in the 1830s that the earliest pioneers arrived in the Orléans area. Amongst the first Francophones were the Dupuis, Besserer, Major, Duford and Vézina families. A few English-speaking families also made Orléans their home from the very beginning, such as the Kennys and the McNeelys. In 1880, the parish was made up of 43 Anglophone families and 131 Francophone families.

In 1858, the first subdivision plans (Lots 1 and 2) were registered in the County of Carleton, for Gloucester Township, thereby creating the Village of Saint-Joseph d'Orléans. In 1859, François Dupuis also registered his plan (Lot 3) including St. John (St-Jean), Dupuis (Dessere), and Scott Streets (St-Charles).

Orleans was named by Msgr. Ebrard in the late 1850s for the city of the same name in France.  According to the Canadian Permanent Committee on Geographical Names files he applied for establishment of a post office "plus tard en 1859".  It was granted in 1860.

In 1860, Father Alphonse-Marius Chaîne was appointed resident priest of the new Saint-Joseph d’Orléans parish, founded in October of the same year.

In 1885, the first church opened its doors. In 1922, a second church - the current one - replaced the first which had been destroyed by fire. The parish priest was Mgr. Hilaire Chartrand.

In the same year (1922) Orléans became a semi-autonomous municipality, known as a police village, and more decisions were made locally. The police village was governed by a council consisting of three volunteers elected to preserve peace, health, and public safety. At the time, the village was part of Gloucester Township, which in turn, was part of Carleton County. However, some parishioners lived in Cumberland Township, east of Champlain Street, the dividing line between the townships.

By the 1950s, St-Joseph Boulevard became a major artery, with storefronts multiplying everywhere and new restaurants opening up the length of the through fare. Social life took on a decidedly community flavour, with clubs and community associations being formed. Commercial life improved considerably in Orléans in 1955 with the establishment of the first Chamber of Commerce in Orléans, which campaigned on behalf of various causes, such as pressing for a decent water and sewer system in the 1960s. The quiet, rural community that was once Orléans lived its last moments in 1958, when developers hit the town, and from then on, things would never be the same. Orléans has known dramatic residential growth since then, which has led to profound social and linguistic changes in the make-up of the population.

The first major real estate development was Queenswood Heights with construction beginning in 1958. In 1970, the Grey Nuns of Charity Congregation sold 500 acres of land to the Costain and Minto real estate companies, which launched major developments in the Convent Glen, Orléans Wood, Chatelaine Village areas, etc.

On Jan. 1 1974, the village of Saint-Joseph d’Orléans was incorporated into the Regional Municipality of Ottawa-Carleton. It was in the 1970s that the first high schools opened their doors, and after-class hours had Orléans youth start setting up their own clubs.

The housing and population boom years for Orléans came in the decade from 1981 to 1991. The population of Orléans tripled and grew from 24,000 to 70,000 people. Orléans recorded the second-highest population growth rate in the entire country in the late 1980s.

In 1989, Orléans became a municipality, Cumberland Township moved its city hall from Leonard, Ont. to Orléans. Orleans continued its residential developments through the 1990s. In addition to the residential developments, the 1990s in Orleans saw the final expansion of the Place d'Orléans shopping centre, a movie theatre, several new restaurants, new businesses, four new high schools, etc.

In 2001, Orléans was amalgamated into the City of Ottawa, becoming Urban sub-area No. 16 (now No. 15). The country-wide housing boom starting from 2000 has also seen an extremely large amount of housing and residential areas being developed in the eastern Orléans area west of Trim Road and south of Innes Road, such as the new communities Avalon, Notting Gate (including Notting Hill). The population and business growth in the area prompted the re-development of Innes Road from a two-lane to a four-lane road in 2005. With the Innes Road expansion, newer business areas along Innes Road between Trim and Pagé Roads, consist of many large retail outlets, restaurants, gyms, a movie theatre, etc.

Timeline 

 1833 – François Dupuis, founder of Orléans, is listed on St. Joseph assessment rolls.
 1834 – First Anglo settlers arrive in Blackburn Hamlet.
 1836 – Cummings Bridge links Montreal Road to Bytown.
 1846 – François Dupuis arrives with wife Mary Scott in what will be Orléans
 1849 – First Catholic Chapel Saint-François-Xavier, opens on land donated by François Dupuis.
 1850 – Post Office opens in Notre-Dame-de-Lourdes.
 1850 – Road opened between Cumberland and Gloucester and Bytown.
 1850 – Toll gate opens at Green’s Creek.
 1850 – Besserer family begins operating summer resort at Besserer’s Grove with quay at Besserer’s Landing – closed in 1885.
 1855 – Father François-Joseph Michel opens Catholic mission in Cumberland, previously known as Foubertville.
 1856 – Luc Major arrives in Orléans and opens tavern.
 1858 – Luc Major draws up first plan of Orléans
 1860 – Postmaster Jean Théodore Besserer gives St-Joseph-d’Orléans its name after his place of birth.
 1860 – Private French school opens in Orléans.
 1868 – McArthur Road opens as short-cut to Cyrville through McArthur Farm to avoid costly Montreal Road tolls.
 1871 – Start of construction on St-Joseph-d’ Orléans Church – completed in 1885.
 1882 – Canada Atlantic Railway opens from Ottawa to Carlsbad Springs and Maritimes. Today it is a Via Rail line
 1885 – Grey Nuns buy 500 acres for giant Youville Farm in Orléans.
 1890 – First Catholic Separate school opens in Orléans. Grey Nuns run it.
 1891 – Construction of St-Joseph Church rectory.
 1893 – Orléans opens cemetery behind St-Joseph Church
 1895 – Irish Catholics open first English-language separate school in Orléans – demolished in 1956.
 1900 – Antoine Leduc opens hotel in Orléans
 1902 – CPR Short Line Railway opens from Ottawa to Blackburn Hamlet. Orléans asks for a railway too.
 1909 – CN Railway opens line between Ottawa to Orléans and on to Hawkesbury. Land used for Queensway after rail line closes in 1939.
 1910 – (April 6) Hiawatha Park subdivision approved – not be developed until 1950s.
 1911 – Temperance sweeps Ontario. Sale of liquor banned in every tavern, inn and place of entertainment in Orléans
 1915 – First police constable appointed in Orléans
 1917 – Oblate Fathers arrive and open Saint-Joseph Farm – closed in 1963 and became Ferme d’Orléans
 1920 – Orléans gets first bank, Provincial Bank of Canada
 1920 – Construction starts on present-day St-Joseph Church – only took two years to build.
 1922 – St-Joseph-d’Orléans incorporated as semi-autonomous “Police Village” with partial powers.
 1925 – Dr Émile Major is first resident-doctor in Orléans
 1939 – Reeve Jack Innes dies in office. Saint-François Concession Road re-named after him.
 1940 – St. Joseph School replaces Académie St-Joseph.
 1945 – Queensway being built on old rail line in Ottawa
 1952 – Highway 17 rebuilt through Orléans
 1953 – St-Louis-de-Montfort Hospital opens.
 1954 – Passenger service discontinued on Ottawa and New York railway between Ottawa and Cornwall
 1956 – (May 15) Fighter jet crashes into Grey Nuns Villa St-Louis Convent in Orléans – 15 killed.
 1957 – Ottawa and New York Railway (New York Central) abandoned
 1957 – Orléans gets first fire station. It will burn down two years later.
 1958 – Orléans public library opens in school basement – only public library in Gloucester until 1971.
 1958 – NCC predecessor expropriates 22,500 acres of Gloucester farmland for the Greenbelt.
 1958 – Orléans fails in bid for full municipal status.
 1960 – Queensway opens from Hurdman’s to Green’s Creek.
 1962 – First library board established in Orléans.
 1962 – Green’s Creek Pollution Control Centre opens.
 1962 – Motel Normandie opens.
 1962 – Grandmaître family sells sand from Petrie Island
 1967 – Water mains installed for first time in Orléans.
 1968 – Construction begins on Highway 417
 1968 – Blair Road Queensway Interchange opens
 1970 – Big housing boom starts in Orléans
 1971 – Highway 417 reaches Gloucester.
 1971 – Beacon Hill Bullet bus service starts to downtown
 1971 – Gloucester Skating Club opens.
 1972 – Garneau Secondary School opens, first in Orléans
 1972 – Canadian Forces Station Gloucester closes down
 1972 – OC Transpo extends city bus service to Beacon Hill, Blackburn Hamlet, and Orléans
 1972 – Gloucester Coat of Arms put on police cars.
 1973 – OC Transpo takes over Beacon Hill Bullet bus service
 1973 – Blackburn Branch of Public Library opens.
 1974 – Regional Municipality of Ottawa-Carleton absorbs Orléans.
 1976 – Blackburn Arena opens.
 1977 – J.B. Potvin Arena opens.
 1978 – (May) Gloucester Historical Society re-established.
 1979 – MIFO founded, major cultural boost.
 1979 – First English-Catholic parish, Divine Infant
 1979 – First Protestant Church, Orléans United Church
 1980 – Orleans Recreation Complex opens.
 1980 – Place d’Orléans Shopping Centre opens.
 1981 – Township of Gloucester incorporated as a City.
 1983 – First newspaper in Orléans, the bilingual Express.
 1986 – First English-language newspaper, Orleans Star
 1989 – Third municipal offices opened in Orléans
 2001 – Orléans absorbed into City of Ottawa
 2003 – Petrie island turned into recreation area
 2007 – Orléans Recreation Complex renamed Bob MacQuarrie Recreation Complex
 2009 – Opening of Shenkman Arts Centre
 2010 – Cité Collégiale opens a Trades school – Alphonse-Desjardins

Recreation and arts 

Bob MacQuarrie Recreation Complex (formerly Orléans Recreation Complex) houses the Elizabeth Manley Figure Skating Arena, the Roger Sénécal Arena, squash and racquetball courts and a fitness centre. A variety of recreation programs are offered including fitness, fitness classes, summer camps, indoor cycling, aqua fitness, swimming lessons and general interest programs. The Elizabeth Manley skating rink at the Bob MacQuarrie Recreation Complex is named for figure skater Elizabeth Manley who trained at the facility. Manley won a Silver Medal in Women's figure skating in the 1988 Calgary Winter Olympics. It is home to the Gloucester Skating Club and the Canadian Academy of Skating Arts. The skating club is well known for sending skaters to national and international level competitions.

Ray Friel Recreation Complex is the largest and most comprehensive recreation complex in Orleans featuring three National Hockey League (NHL) size arenas including the Ron Racette Arena. With 12 full dressing rooms and separate referee and alternate dressing rooms. The complex also features a fitness centre with over 20,000 square feet of state-of-the-art training equipment, a wave pool, whirlpool, sauna, physiotherapy clinic, Douvris Martial Arts, pro shop, restaurant and a coffee shop. A variety of recreation programs are also offered including, fitness classes, summer camps, indoor cycling, aqua fitness, swimming lessons and general interest programs.

Millennium Sports Park is a 34 hectare sports and recreational complex, consisting of 15 Soccer and Football fields located at 100 Millennium Blvd in Orleans. The closest major intersection to the Sports Park is Innes Road @ Trim Road. The site is currently home to a number of youth sporting clubs in the Eastern half of the Greater Ottawa Area. Currently, the largest tenants at the facility are Ottawa TFC soccer club (formerly known as the Cumberland United Soccer Club) and the Cumberland Panthers football club.

Petrie Island is situated along the Ottawa River in the north-east of Orléans. The Petrie Islands were formed by sand deposited at the close of  the last ice age, about 12,000 years ago. The 2 km by 500 m area, from the foot of Champlain St. to Trim Rd in Orleans, has a total shoreline length, including all channels and bays, of about 12 km. Much of the area has been publicly owned since 1983, purchased to preserve the natural habitat of the western portion of the islands. Sand dredging at the eastern end was phased out in 2003, and the ten-hectare sand fill and natural beach is now in use for public recreation. Petrie Island is home to turtles in some of its sheltered lagoons and has a nature centre for learning more about the local environment. There is a marina with canoe and kayak rentals. Petrie Island is host to annual Canada Day celebrations for the Orléans community.

There are also several nature trails and paths throughout the area including the Bilberry Creek Trail and the Princess Louise Trail (incl. a waterfall) through which Taylor Creek runs. In 1984 the Township formed a committee to develop a policy for uses of Conservation lands and approved the policy in March 1985. In 1988 a Township wide Nature trails sub-committee was formed under the Cumberland Township Recreation committee. This Committee, composed of volunteer Township residents advises and assists the Township in the development, maintenance and protection of the natural areas within Cumberland.

At present there are:

 2.7 km of trails in Chatelaine Village
 5.5 km of trails in Queenswood/Fallingbrook Escarpment
 9 km of trails in Ravine – Township Western boundary (Q.H.)
 2 km of trails in Cumberland Village

In 2009, the Shenkman Arts Centre opened just east of Place d'Orléans.  It is a multidisciplinary arts centre that houses two theatres, seven galleries and 17 studios. The Centre houses activities within specialized spaces for hands-on instruction, creation and presentation of the visual, performing, literary and media arts and unique spaces for receptions and special events. Operated by the City of Ottawa, this diversity of programs and activities is attributed to a unique collaboration with the Centre’s Resident Arts Partners: AOE Arts Council, Gloucester Pottery School, MIFO (Mouvement d’implication francophone d’Orléans), Ottawa School of Art–Orléans Campus, and OYP Theatre School. The Centre is also home to Resident Company Tara Luz Danse and ARTicipate, a one-of-a-kind endowment fund that supports innovative programming at the Centre.

A memorial diorama by Bruce Garner was erected August 13, 2000 in the Memorial Park near Royal Canadian Legion, Branch 632 to remember those who have served Canada in wars and as peace keepers.

Neighbourhoods 

Avalon: Located south of Innes Road, west of Portobello Boulevard and east of Mer-Bleue Road.

Bilberry Creek: Located east of Jeanne d'Arc Boulevard, north of Highway 174 and east towards the eastern end of the development.

Cardinal Creek: Located north of Innes Road, west of Cardinal Creek and St-Joseph Blvd. Western boundary overlaps with Fallingbrook.

Chapel Hill North: Located north of Innes Road in the Orléans Boulevard area and south of St-Joseph Boulevard.

Chapel Hill South: Located south of Innes Road, and north of Navan Road.

Chaperal: Located south of Innes Road and north of Brian Coburn Blvd, between Mer Bleue Road and Tenth Line Road.

Chateauneuf: Is bounded by St-Joseph Boulevard on the north, Innes Road on the south. The eastern border includes Jeanne d'Arc-Sunview-Des Grives-Barsona-Place Belleterre-Duford Drive, and Orléans Boulevard borders the west.

Chatelaine Village: Located north of Highway 174 toward the Ottawa River and East of Willow Ave.

Convent Glen: Located north of Highway 174 toward the Ottawa River and west of Jeanne d'Arc Boulevard.

Convent Glen South: Located south of Highway 174 and north of St. Joseph Blvd and generally west of Orléans Blvd.

Eastridge : Future community situated near Trim Road and Blackburn By-Pass Road south of Notting Gate community.

Fallingbrook: Located south of St-Joseph Boulevard, west of Trim Road, north of Innes Road and east of Tenth Line Road.

Hiawatha Park: Older neighbourhood on the Ottawa River, located north of Convent Glen.

Notre-Dame-des-Champs: Located near Mer Bleue and Navan Road.

Notting Gate: Located south of Innes Road, east of Portobello Boulevard, and west of Trim Road.

Orleans Village: Oldest part of Orleans, located along St-Joseph Blvd between Orléans Blvd and Duford Dr.

Orleans Wood: Located north of Highway 174 toward the Ottawa River, east of Jeanne d'Arc Boulevard and west of Champlain Street.

Queenswood Heights: Located south of St-Joseph Boulevard, west of Tenth Line Road, east of Duford Road.

Queenswood Village: Older neighbourhood located between Champlain St and Willow Ave, north of Highway 174.

River Walk: Located east of Tenth Line, north of Highway 174.

Population history 

1971 – 6,000
1976 – 11,000
1981 – 24,000
1986 – 47,000
1991 – 70,000
1996 – 79,000
2001 – 84,695
2006 – 95,491
2011 – 107,823
2016 – 116,688

Schools and education

English Catholic 

High school
St. Matthew High School
St. Peter Catholic High School
Elementary
Blessed Kateri Tekakwitha Catholic School
Chapel Hill Catholic School
Convent Glen Catholic School
Divine Infant Catholic School
Our Lady of Wisdom Catholic School
St. Clare Catholic School
St Francis of Assisi Catholic
St. Teresa Catholic School
Good Shepherd Catholic School
St. Dominic Catholic School

French Catholic 

High school
École secondaire catholique Béatrice-Desloges
École secondaire catholique Garneau
Collège catholique Mer-Bleue

Elementary
École élémentaire catholique Arc-en-ciel
École élémentaire catholique de la Découverte
École élémentaire catholique Alain-Fortin
École élémentaire catholique des Pionniers
École élémentaire catholique des Voyageurs
École élémentaire catholique L'Étoile-de-l'Est
École élémentaire catholique Notre-Dame-des-Champs
École élémentaire catholique Reine-des-Bois
École élémentaire catholique Saint-Joseph d'Orléans
École élémentaire catholique Sainte-Marie
École élémentaire catholique d'enseignement personnalisé La Source
École élémentaire catholique Des Villageois (Closed)
École élémentaire publique Préseault (Closed)

French public 

High school
École secondaire publique Gisèle-Lalonde

Elementary
École élémentaire Des Sentiers
École élémentaire Jeanne-Sauvé
École élémentaire L'Odyssée
École élémentaire Le Prélude

English public 

High school
Cairine Wilson Secondary School
Sir Wilfrid Laurier Secondary School

Elementary
Avalon Elementary School
Convent Glen Elementary School
Dunning-Foubert Elementary School
Fallingbrook Community Elementary School
Forest Valley Elementary School
Henry Larsen Elementary School
Maple Ridge Elementary School
Orleans Wood Elementary School
Summerside Elementary School
Terry-Fox Public Elementary School
Trillium Public Elementary School

Queenswood Public School closed in 2008(now Coccinelle (Garderie) École La Source)

Main roads and streets 
Orléans Blvd.
Champlain St.
Jeanne-d'Arc Blvd.
Des Épinettes Ave.
St-Joseph Blvd. 
Charlemagne Blvd.
Innes Road
Tenth Line Road
Trim Road
Portobello Blvd.
Brian Coburn Blvd.
Mer-Bleue Road.

The main highway linking Orléans to central Ottawa to the west is officially known as Ottawa Regional Road 174 and forms part of the Queensway.
Place d'Orléans Dr.

Notes

 History and Timeline information was collected by leveraging the Orléans, Ontario .PDF uploaded to this page just below.

References 

Neighbourhoods in Ottawa
Former municipalities now in Ottawa
Former villages in Ontario